Loryma sentiusalis is a species of snout moth in the genus Loryma. It was described by Francis Walker in 1859 and is known from South Africa.

References

Endemic moths of South Africa
Moths described in 1859
Pyralini
Moths of Africa